The Coimbra trolleybus system forms part of the public transport network in the city of Coimbra, Portugal.  Opened in 1947, it supplemented, and then eventually replaced, the Coimbra tramway network. Service has been temporarily suspended since March 2021 and is not expected to resume before late 2024.

History
Trolleybus service was inaugurated in Coimbra on 16 August 1947 with two Saurer 3TP trolleybuses. The original operator was Serviços Municipalizados de Coimbra (SMC), a municipal authority that had operated the city's tram system since 1920 and also managed the provision of water and gas.

Initially, the trolleybus system only partially replaced Coimbra's tramway network, but after several decades of concurrent operations the latter was closed, in January 1980.

Until 1959, the Coimbra trolleybus system was the only one in Portugal. Since the closure of the Porto system in 1997, that has again been the case.

With effect from 1 January 1985, SMC's responsibility for water and sanitation services was moved to a new, separate authority, and the now transport-only authority was renamed Serviços Municipalizados de Transportes Urbanos de Coimbra (SMTUC). Six trolleybus routes were in operation in 1988 (1, 3–6, and 8).

Since March 2021, all trolleybus service has been temporarily suspended, initially because of road works and later because of disruptions caused by construction of a Bus Rapid Transit line (named Metro Mondego).

Lines 
The system currently has two lines, 4 and 103. Although currently suspended (operate by motorbuses), their overhead wiring is being kept intact except for short sections affected by the BRT construction, as both routes are expected to resume after the latter is completed.

Fleet

Past fleet 

The initial two-member Saurer fleet was augmented in 1949, with the acquisition of six new buses from Sunbeam Commercial Vehicles. They were fitted with single-deck bodywork by Park Royal Vehicles, with 40 seats and room for 35 standing passengers. In order to enable them to be operated by just the driver, they included an overhang of  beyond the front axle, allowing the entrance door to be mounted just behind the windscreen, so that payment could be made to the driver when entering the vehicle. To cope with the steep gradients of the Coimbra system, they were fitted with  600-volt motors, and each trolleybus carried two compressors, normally designed to work together, but each capable of maintaining the air supply for braking and door operation if one should fail. Three more Sunbeam Park Royals joined the fleet in 1956.

Subsequent procurements included 10 BUT RETB/1s (four in 1958 and six in 1961), and six further Sunbeams in 1965.

Current fleet 
Today, the Coimbra trolleybus fleet is as follows:

 10 conventional (two-axle) Caetano/EFACEC vehicles, built between 1984 and 1986;
 1 secondhand conventional Caetano/EFACEC trolleybus (with auxiliary diesel engine), borrowed from the closed Porto system;
 1 conventional Solaris Trollino, delivered in 2009 (No. 75).

See also

List of trolleybus systems
Metro Mondego

References

References

Books

External links

 Coimbra trolleybuses (on the Trolleymotion website)
 

Coimbra
Coimbra
Coimbra